Jan Lužný, CSc. (4 February 1926, Liptovský Mikuláš – 29 January 2013, Olomouc) was a Czech plant-breeder and expert on gardening. Between 1965 - 1992 he gave lectures at the University of Agriculture in Brno (current name: Mendel University Brno). He wrote more than 70 papers about plant-breeding. After his retirement, he became an amateur historian and published many articles about local history of Čechůvky.

Works 
 EUCARPIA breeding and propagation of ornamental plants: papers submitted at the International Symposium of the University of Agriculture Brno, Faculty of Horticulture Lednice na Moravě, Prague September 16.-18.1986. Brno: University of Agriculture, 1986. 194 s.
 Use of epispermoscopic analysis in seed assessment. [Brno], 1982.

Honors and awards 
 G. J. Mendel honorary medal for merit in the biological sciences (2006)

References 

Czech agronomists
Plant breeding
People from Liptovský Mikuláš
1926 births
2013 deaths
Academic staff of Mendel University Brno